Tecmo World Cup Soccer is a video game for the Nintendo Entertainment System.  Released in 1990 by Tecmo, as its name suggests it is a soccer game focusing on the World Cup. It is a port of Tehkan World Cup, released on arcades in 1985.

Although the two games appear virtually identical, Tecmo World Cup Soccer lacks some of the speed and fluidity of its arcade progenitor. While the gameplay is ostensibly unchanged, the lack of support for analog control in the NES version renders it a digital-control-only game that requires almost completely different tactics.

Tecmo World Cup Soccer is not to be confused with Nintendo World Cup (released the same year), nor Tecmo Cup Soccer Game (known as Captain Tsubasa in Japan).

World Cup Teams
The national teams in Tecmo World Cup Soccer are as follows (in order, they are available to choose in game "Team Select" menu):

Similarities to Tehkan World Cup
Tecmo World Cup Soccer, released five years after its arcade ancestor, is a mostly faithful conversion of Tehkan World Cup squeezed with some concessions into the smaller NES hardware. These are the main similarities between both games:

 The same musical score (albeit adapted to the NES sound hardware)
 Nearly identical gameplay (although significantly hampered by the absence of analog control)
 Almost identical graphics (partially simplified and slowed down)

Differences to Tehkan World Cup
As Tehkan World Cup utilized two processors for gameplay and four processors for sound, certain concessions were made to playability on the NES. While the gameplay and graphics remained largely unaltered, certain features were omitted. In recognition of its new home system format, some arcade elements such as the instant knockout, were abandoned in order to provide greater longevity. A partial list of differences includes:

 A choice of teams is now available
 Competition format
 Game lengths
 On-screen "scoreboard" (includes large font game clock and score) omitted
 Field radar showing player positions omitted
 The "grass" had a simpler, more unified texture
 Players do not celebrate during the goal sequence
 The goal net is shown to bulge upon receipt of the ball
 Slide tackles can be initiated by the player
 The ball could bounce after a high kick
 The ball rebounds from the net and goalposts in a slightly different manner

See also
 Tehkan World Cup
 Tecmo Cup Football Game
 Super Sidekicks
 Tecmo World Cup '90
 International Superstar Soccer
 Neo Geo Cup '98: The Road to the Victory
 Legendary Eleven

References

External links
 Tecmo World Cup Soccer tournaments on VK.com
 Clip of Tecmo World Cup Soccer on youtube

1990 video games
Association football video games
Nintendo Entertainment System games
Tecmo games
Video games developed in Japan